Ed Marshall (born September 23, 1947) is a former American football wide receiver and tight end who played in the National Football League.

College career
Marshall played both football and basketball at Cameron University. He led the Aggies in scoring for as a sophomore, junior and senior and is the school's all-time leading receiver with 113 receptions for 2,448 yards and 29 touchdowns (Cameron discontinued football in 1992). Marshall was inducted into Cameron's Athletic Hall of Fame in 2011.

Professional career
Marshall was selected by the Cincinnati Bengals in the 11th round of the 1971 NFL Draft. He played one season with the team before being cut the next year. Marshall spent the next two seasons out of football until signing with the Memphis Southmen of the newly-formed World Football League (WFL). In his first season, Marshall caught 60 passes for 1,159 yards and a league-leading 19 touchdowns and was named All-WFL. In 1975 he had 31 receptions for 582 yards and nine touchdowns before the league folded twelve games into the season. Marshall's 28 total touchdowns scored were the most in the league's short history. After the  WFL folded Marshall was signed by the Detroit Lions, but was cut at the end of training camp. He was picked up by the New York Jets and played in the team's season opener. The Jets waived Marshall the following week on September 16, 1976. He was signed by the New York Giants on November 1, 1976. Marshall was waived by the Giants after the end of the 1977 season.

References

External links
Cameron Hall of Fame profile

1947 births
Living people
American football wide receivers
Cameron Aggies football players
Players of American football from Texas
Cincinnati Bengals players
New York Giants players
Memphis Southmen players
Cameron Aggies men's basketball players
Sportspeople from Corpus Christi, Texas